Brian Óscar Sarmiento (born 22 April 1990) is an Argentine professional footballer who plays as a forward for All Boys.

Other than in his country, he played in Spain, Brazil, Peru and Greece.

Club career
Born in Rosario, Santa Fe, Sarmiento began his career in Argentina with Estudiantes de La Plata, signing for La Liga side Racing de Santander in July 2007. A complicated transfer situation between both clubs, which involved the Court of Arbitration for Sport's mediation, meant that the 17-year-old spent the entire 2007–08 season without making a single first-team appearance.

For the 2008–09 campaign, Sarmiento was loaned to Xerez CD of Segunda División, first appearing officially in a 1–1 home draw against Real Murcia on 3 September 2008 in the second round of the Copa del Rey. Although not an undisputed starter, he did feature significantly as the Andalusians achieved a first-ever top flight promotion, earning the nickname Currito de Jerez by their fans in the process.

On 31 August 2009, Sarmiento went on another season-long loan, yet in the second level, now with Girona FC. He made his first appearance on 3 October in a 2–2 draw with SD Huesca, scoring his team's second goal, but was released by the Catalans in late January 2010 for disciplinary issues, subsequently training with former club Santander to stay fit.

Sarmiento spent 2010–11 with UD Salamanca, again on loan and in the Spanish second tier. He netted for the first time in the league on 15 January 2011, but in 2–3 home loss to FC Barcelona B. On 1 March he scored the game's only goal at home against Villarreal CF B, helping the Castile and León side to their first win in three months.

Sarmiento then returned to the Argentine Primera División, where he represented in quick succession Racing Club de Avellaneda, Arsenal de Sarandí and All Boys. Following a very brief spell in Brazil with Associação Atlética Ponte Preta, he went back to his country with Quilmes Atlético Club.

On 21 January 2015, Sarmiento joined Peruvian Primera División's Real Garcilaso. During his one-year spell in Cusco, he played 39 matches across all competitions and scored eight times; additionally, he bought a bar in the city.

Back in Argentina, Sarmiento played for Club Atlético Banfield and Newell's Old Boys. During his stint at the latter club, marred by injuries, he was often more talked about for his behaviour off the pitch.

In June 2019, Sarmiento signed for Greek club Volos FC. In September, after only eight minutes of action in the Super League, his contract was terminated by mutual consent, and he returned to All Boys shortly after on a one-and-a-half-year deal.

International career
Sarmiento was named Best Newcomer while playing for the Argentina under-17 team, in a friendly tournament in 2006. He also represented the nation at under-20 level.

References

External links
 

1990 births
Living people
Footballers from Rosario, Santa Fe
Argentine footballers
Association football forwards
Argentine Primera División players
Primera Nacional players
Estudiantes de La Plata footballers
Racing Club de Avellaneda footballers
Arsenal de Sarandí footballers
All Boys footballers
Quilmes Atlético Club footballers
Club Atlético Banfield footballers
Newell's Old Boys footballers
Segunda División players
Racing de Santander players
Xerez CD footballers
Girona FC players
UD Salamanca players
Campeonato Brasileiro Série A players
Associação Atlética Ponte Preta players
Peruvian Primera División players
Real Garcilaso footballers
Super League Greece players
Volos N.F.C. players
Argentina youth international footballers
Argentine expatriate footballers
Expatriate footballers in Spain
Expatriate footballers in Brazil
Expatriate footballers in Peru
Expatriate footballers in Greece
Argentine expatriate sportspeople in Spain
Argentine expatriate sportspeople in Brazil
Argentine expatriate sportspeople in Peru
Argentine expatriate sportspeople in Greece